The Lady Iron Chef is a 2007 Cantonese language Hong Kong Chinese New Year film produced by Wong Jing and directed by Chung Siu-Hung.

Cast 
 Charmaine Sheh as Ceci
 Hacken Lee as S.K To a.k.a. SK2
 Yuen Qiu as Lady Green
 Wong Jing as Souza
 Yumiko Cheng as May
 Cheung Tat-ming as H.O To a.k.a. 
 Lau Yeung as Jade
 Alice Chan		
 Gao Lu		
 Lam Chi-chung		
 Tats Lau		
 Lee Kin-Yan		
 Lee Lik-Chi		
 Zuki Lee		
 Winnie Leung		
 Liu Yang - Mai Yuk-ying
 Ng Chi Hung	
 Gill Mohindepaul Singh		
 Patrick Tang		
 Tin Kai Man		
 Wang Tian-lin		
 Wong Man-Wai - S.K.To's mom
 Wong Yut Fei

Synopsis
The Lady Iron Chef is a comedy movie.

On the day of the Supreme Dim Sum competition, Madame To and her son SK To (Hacken) were appointed judges, since they owned one of the largest catering corporations in HK. All three of the contestants failed, but one mystery contestant impresses. The winner was Jade (Lau Yeung) and Madame To wanted her son to marry Jade. Ceci (Charmaine), a lower-class girl employed to introduce the chefs onto the stage, was much impressed by SK more than Jade. Though SK was impressed with Jade, he refused to marry her.

SK was kidnapped one night and was held to ransom. However, luck would have it that the kidnappers imprisoned him in a small room on the rooftop of the building where Ceci lived with her father, Souza (Wong Jing). Ceci saved SK, and hid him in her home. Ceci took SK on a tour of Mongkok where SK did many things his mother never permitted him to do. He found Ceci's carefree attitude to life refreshing and fell in love with her.

SK took Ceci home to see his mother, who insisted that she would only consent to Ceci marrying SK if she cooked as well as Jade. Souza took her to Macau to learn the art of cooking from his ex-girlfriend Lady Green (Yuen Qiu) who was a descendant of another school of royal chef and an expert in using ordinary food to make a superb meal.

Ceci worked hard, and learned everything Lady Green taught her within a few months. She was confident enough to challenge Jade. It was not only a personal duel between Jade and Ceci, but also a contest between two schools of cooking, the North versus the South. During the last round, Ceci gave Jade a loaf of bread, by means of which Jade make the "Emperor toast" which won applause from all the judges. Ceci was given some noodles, by means of which she made a plate of "Brokeback Noodles" (possibly a parody of brokeback mountain). Ceci wins, due to Jade.

References

External links
 
 GSC Movies, The Lady Iron Chef

Hong Kong comedy films
2007 films